Serhiy Motuz (born 6 June 1982) is a Ukrainian footballer currently playing for PFC Oleksandriya, as a striker.

External links
 
 
Official team website

1982 births
Living people
Ukrainian footballers
Ukraine youth international footballers
FC Dynamo Kyiv players
FC Hoverla Uzhhorod players
FC Vorskla Poltava players
FC Dnipro players
FC Obolon-Brovar Kyiv players
FC Kryvbas Kryvyi Rih players
Ukrainian Premier League players
Association football forwards
Footballers from Dnipro